The Betsy Riot is a radical left group that describes itself as a "decentralized neo-suffragette, punk-patriot resistance movement." They are pro-gun control. The group began in August 2016, primarily with an anti-gun industry focus, but during the Trump administration the group focused protests on administration policy. The group uses profanity, satire and a radical feminist posture in its messaging, with tactics that include graffiti, theatrical protests, pranks, and coordinated messaging actions, such as mailings, banners, and flyers. The group has also encouraged vandalism to further their agenda.

As part of an ongoing demonstration against gun rights advocates, Betsy Riot purchased johnlott.com (John Lott) and waynelapierre.com (Wayne LaPierre) and runs them as parody sites.

References

External links 
 

Far-left politics in the United States
Gun control advocacy groups in the United States
Political activism